The Gilyuy is a river in Amur Oblast, Russia. It is a right tributary of the Zeya, and is 545 km long, with a drainage basin of 22,500 km². The river has its sources on the southern slopes of the Stanovoy Mountains, passes near Tynda and flows southeast into the Zeya Reservoir.

Its main tributaries are the Mogot and the Tynda.

See also
List of rivers of Russia

References

Rivers of Amur Oblast